Aleksandr Nechayev is the name of:
 Aleksandr Nikolaevich Nechayev (1902–1986), Russian and Soviet folklorist
 Aleksandr Petrovich Nechayev, Russian scientist in the field of pedology
 Aleksandr Vladimirovich Nechayev (born 1987), Russian footballer with FC Rostov, FC Krasnodar and FC SKA-Energiya Khabarovsk
 Aleksandr Yevgenyevich Nechayev (born 1989), Russian footballer with FC Saturn Moscow Oblast and FC Sokol-Saratov
 Alexander Nechayev (politician), acting mayor of Yaroslavl
 Alyaksandr Nyachayew (born 1994), Belarusian footballer